The Commission of Public Charities was an organization in New York City

Commissioners 
Silas B. Croft 1896
John W. Keller 1901
Homer Folks 1902 
Michael J. Drummond 1910
William R. Stewart (New York) 1913
John A. Kingsbury 1914 to 1917

References

Main